Ludmilla Kunzmann (1774–1843) was a Czech businessperson.

Kunzmann was the daughter of Johann Jakob Gottschald (1731–1806) and in 1812 married the merchant Johann Joseph Kunzmann, with whom she had four children.  When she was widowed in 1826, she inherited the business of her late spouse, including the Spitzenfabrik Anton Gottschald & Comp., a business company which played a major role in the industrialization of the Austrian Empire.

References 

 J.B. Schilling: Adressenbuch der Handlungs-Gremien und Fabriken, der kais. kön. Haupt- und Residenzstadt Wien, dann mehrerer Provinzialstädte für das Jahr 1833. 1833 (google.de [retrieved 11 July 2017]).

1774 births
1843 deaths
19th-century Czech businesspeople
19th-century businesswomen